Jason Scott Dolley (born July 5, 1991) is an American actor and musician, known for his roles in Disney Channel shows and movies. These include Newton "Newt" Livingston III on Cory in the House, Virgil Fox in Minutemen, Connor Kennedy in Read It and Weep, Pete Ivey in Hatching Pete, and PJ Duncan on Good Luck Charlie.

Early life and education
Jason Scott Dolley was born in Los Angeles, California on July 5, 1991. He has an older brother named Jeffrey (Born 1989). In 2010, he took college courses in philosophy at Moorpark College and at California Lutheran University.

Career 
Dolley gained his first stage experience at 11 when he and one of his brothers performed the Abbott and Costello "Who's on First?" routine in a school talent show. 

His first acting jobs came that same year. He won the lead role in the award-winning short film titled Chasing Daylight. He was then cast by director Mel Gibson to be T.J. Savage on the ABC series Complete Savages. After Complete Savages was canceled, he starred in the film Saving Shiloh as Marty Preston, in the Disney Channel Original Movie Read It and Weep as Connor Kennedy and in the film The Air I Breathe.

In 2006, Dolley appeared in Duracell's commercial "Trusted Everywhere" Campaign "Amazon". Dolley was part of the Yellow team in the second edition of the Disney Channel Games, broadcast in mid-2007. From 2007 to 2008, Dolley starred in the Disney Channel show Cory in the House. In 2008, he appeared in the film Minutemen as Virgil Fox and was in the third edition of the Disney Channel Games on the Green Team. Dolley also guest-starred as the prince in Imagination Movers. In 2009, Jason starred in the Disney film Hatching Pete as Pete Ivey. In 2010, Dolley began appearing in his second Disney Channel Original Series, Good Luck Charlie as P.J. Duncan.

When asked about his role in the Disney Channel Original Series family sitcom, Good Luck Charlie, he replied, "I like the realness of it. I like the more authentic tone. I like the family sitcom. That's something different for Disney, which also appealed to me." He also said in a different interview, "When I read the script, I was like, 'Oh, this is kind of cool. This is a little different. It has a Full House kind of feel. It's very family-friendly. Families can sit down and watch this and get a real laugh. I think that's what's been cool about it from the start and what's still cool about it today."

Dolley and cast appeared in a feature-length Christmas Disney Channel Original Movie based on the series titled Good Luck Charlie, It's Christmas!, which aired on December 2, 2011. He also voiced the character Rumble in Disney Channel's animated film Pixie Hollow Games, which also stars Brenda Song, Tiffany Thornton, and Zendaya.

Filmography

References

External links

Jason Dolley at Family Tree Legends

1991 births
21st-century American male actors
American Lutherans
American male child actors
American male film actors
American male television actors
California Lutheran University alumni
Living people
Male actors from Los Angeles
People from Simi Valley, California